Zandstra is a surname. Notable people with the surname include:

Falko Zandstra (born 1971), Dutch speed skater
Jerry Zandstra, American religious official
Peter Zandstra, Canadian scientist

See also
 Zandstraat